This is a list of Billboard magazine's Top Hot 100 songs of 1960.

See also
1960 in music
List of Billboard Hot 100 number-one singles of 1960
List of Billboard Hot 100 top-ten singles in 1960

References

1960 record charts
Billboard charts